Wolfgang Tschirk (born 1956) is a retired Austrian high jumper.

He finished thirteenth at the 1981 European Indoor Championships. He also competed at the 1983 World Championships without reaching the final.

He became Austrian high jump champion eleven times in a row from 1974 through 1984 as well as in 1990 and 1991, his winning streak only broke by rivals
Gottfried Wittgruber and Markus Einberger. He also became indoor champion in 1982, 1983, 1986, 1990 and 1991.

References

1956 births
Living people
Austrian male high jumpers